Daniel Evans (born 24 July 1987) is a former English first-class cricketer.

Evans is a right-handed batsman and a right-arm medium-fast bowler who has represented Middlesex since 2007. A graduate of the Durham cricket Academy who represented the England Under-19 XI in 2006.

He has taken 32 wickets in thirteen first-class matches with a personal best of six wickets for 35 runs.

External links
 

1987 births
Living people
English cricketers
Middlesex cricketers